Rita Rusić (born May 16, 1960), also known as Rita Cecchi Gori, is a Croatian-born Italian producer, actress and singer. Rusic's career began as an actress with a major role in the 1982 film Attila flagello di Dio. She was eventually moved into the film industry, with Il pentito in 1982. Later that year she also began filming Joan Lui - Ma un giorno nel paese arrivo io di lunedì.

Following her work as a singer and an actress, Rusić became a producer in the early 1990s. Since then she has been a recognized producer for over 80 films. Many of these films were released primarily in Italy, but a number of them had global success. Rusić also featured on the Italian version of Dancing with the Stars.

Early life 
Rusić was born in 1960 in Poreč, in the Istrian region of Croatia (then part of Yugoslavia). In 1981, she met filmmaker Vittorio Cecchi Gori, whom she eventually married.

Career

Model (1977–1981) 
Rusić started her career as a fashion model at the age of 17. Her modelling career started in Milan, where she worked on mainly advertising campaigns for both magazines and television. Her modelling work led her to work for Fiat, Tampax, Timex and Cognac.

While she was working as a model, she was awarded the beauty pageant titles of Miss Santamarina and Miss Zelena Laguna. While studying medicine at the University of Milan, she met Vittorio Cecchi Gori and subsequently moved into the film industry.

Singer and actress (1982–1992) 
Rusić's first notable film as an actress was the 1982 film Attila flagello di Dio. After acting in several other films during the 1980s, she began managing a film business with her husband Vittorio Cecchi Gori. Following her debut performance as an actress, Rusić moved into the music industry, releasing two singles in 1984 and 1985. Her debut single was Love Me or Leave Me Now. The following year, Rusić released her second single, titled Sex Without Love. The song featured on the soundtrack for the film Joan Lui - Ma un giorno nel paese arrivo io di lunedì, which she also starred in. The single was recorded with Adriano Celentano. In 1988, Rusić starred as Alexandra in the Italian produced film, The Third Solution. The film is based on The Pope's meeting with the head of the Ukrainian Orthodox Church.

Becoming a producer (1993–present) 
Rusić's next major role was as a producer in 1993 on the film Storia di una capinera, where she was Executive Producer. During the same year she was also a producer on two other films, Arriva la bufera and Le donne non-vogliono più. In 1994, she worked as a producer alongside her husband on Il toro. The Italian comedy-drama film was directed by Carlo Mazzacurati and was awarded with the Silver Lion and the Volpi Cup for best supporting actor to Roberto Citran.

In 1995, Rusić produced the film, The Star Maker. The film was originally known as L'Uomo delle stelle in Italy, was directed by Giuseppe Tornatore, while the title role was played by Sergio Castellitto. It was nominated for the Academy Award for Best Foreign Language Film in its year of release.

Rusić produced the Italian science fiction film, titled Nirvana in 1997. It was directed by Gabriele Salvatores and starred Christopher Lambert, Diego Abatantuono, Sergio Rubini, and Stefania Rocca. It was also screened out of competition at the 1997 Cannes Film Festival. Rusić produced Il ciclone and Fuochi d'artificio, and was the domestic and international distributor of Life Is Beautiful, three-time Oscar winner: Best Actor, Best Music Score and Best Foreign Movie, best price of the jury in Cannes Film Festival, and best Italian movie by David di Donatello. Later that year she produced an adaptation film called On Guard, from the 1858 historical novel Le Bossu by Paul Féval. The film is about a skilled swordsman named Lagardère who is befriended by the Duke of Nevers. When the duke is attacked by his evil cousin Gonzague, the duke in his dying moments asks Lagardère to avenge him and look after his infant daughter. After divorcing Vittorio Cecchi Gori in 2000, Rusić became a producer on her own and founded the agency "The Rita Rusić Company". In 2006, she appeared as a leading actress in a TV series 48 Hours. In 2007, she also restarted her career as a singer.

In May 2008 Rusić published a book titled Jet Sex Diario erotico sentimentale, published by CHI Mondadori. In 2009 she went back to acting, appearing in the film Polvere by Massimiliano D'Epirus and Daniel Proietti, playing the part of the mother. She is the creator and writer of the first 12 episodes of the Italian TV series Amiche mie. She was in a jury of Miss Italia in 2009 and 2010. She participated as a guest in hundreds TV shows, including as a judge in several episodes of the Italian version of Dancing with the Stars, replacing Fabio Canino. She also appeared in other reality shows, The Factory in 2006 and Thank God You Are Here in 2009.

Filmography

Discography
 Rita Rusić – Love Me Or Leave Me Now (1984)
 Adriano Celentano featuring Rita Rusić – Sex Without Love (1985)

References

External links
 

1960 births
Living people
20th-century Croatian women singers
Croatian actresses
20th-century Italian women singers
Italian actresses
Yugoslav emigrants to Italy
Italian people of Croatian descent
People from Poreč